The 1950 United States Senate election in Iowa took place on November 7, 1950. Incumbent Republican Senator Bourke B. Hickenlooper was re-elected to a second term in office over Democratic U.S. Undersecertary of Agriculture Albert J. Loveland.

Primary elections were held on June 5. Senator Hickenlooper faced nominal opposition for re-nomination in the Republican primary, while Loveland won a plurality over a five-man Democratic field including former Governor Nelson G. Kraschel and former U.S. Representative Otha Wearin.

Republican primary

Candidates
Bourke B. Hickenlooper, incumbent Senator since 1945
Harry B. Thompson
Earl F. Wisdom

Results

Democratic primary

Candidates
Nelson G. Kraschel, former Governor of Iowa (1937–39)
Albert J. Loveland, U.S. Undersecretary of Agriculture
Alvin P. Meyer
Ernest J. Seemann, perennial candidate
W.M. Shaw, candidate for U.S. House in 1938
Otha Wearin, former U.S. Representative from Glenwood (1933–39)

Results

After losing the primary, Seemann entered the general election as a States' Rights candidate.

General election

Candidates
Bourke B. Hickenlooper, incumbent Senator since 1945 (Republican)
Z. Everett Kellum (Prohibition)
Albert J. Loveland, United States Undersecretary of Agriculture (Democratic)
Leslie O. Ludwig (Socialist Labor)
Ernest J. Seemann, perennial candidate (States' Rights)

Results

See also 
 1950 United States Senate elections

References 

1950
Iowa
United States Senate